Dimo Hadzhidimov (19 February 1875 – 13 September 1924) was a 20th-century Bulgarian teacher, revolutionary and politician from Ottoman Macedonia. He was among the leaders of the left wing of Internal Macedonian Revolutionary Organization (IMRO), which he considered a Bulgarian creation.

Life
Hadzhidimov was born on 19 February 1875 in Gorno Brodi, Ottoman Empire, now located in Serres regional unit, Greece. In 1880 his family emigrated from the Ottoman Empire and settled in Dupnitsa, Bulgaria. He studied pedagogy in Kyustendil and then in Sofia. At that time he was a member of the Bulgarian Workers' Social Democratic Party. After that he worked as a teacher in the Bulgarian schools in Dupnitsa and later in Samokov. He also participated in Ilinden-Preobrazhenie Uprising. After the Young Turks revolution he returned to Ottoman Macedonia and was one of the founders of the People's Federative Party (Bulgarian Section). After 1909 he went back to Sofia, where Hadzhidimov joined the Bulgarian Social Democratic Workers' Party (Narrow Socialists). During the Balkan Wars and WWI Hadzhidimov was a Bulgarian sergeant. He was captured in Thessaloniki during the Second Balkan War and was exiled by the Greek authorities to the island of Paleo Trikeri, where he contracted jaundice. He was later released and returned to Bulgaria. During the First World War, due to his deteriorating health, he served as a non-combatant. After the First World War he was elected as a member of Bulgarian Parliament from the Bulgarian Communist Party. He was assassinated by right-wing IMRO activist Vlado Chernozemski in Sofia in 1924. His surname was given to Zhostovo village (now a town since 1996) in Blagoevgrad Province in 1951; It was renamed as Hadzhidimovo.

Footnotes

1875 births
1924 deaths
People from Salonica vilayet
Members of the Internal Macedonian Revolutionary Organization
Bulgarians from Aegean Macedonia
People murdered in Bulgaria
Assassinated Bulgarian politicians
Bulgarian educators
Macedonia under the Ottoman Empire
Bulgarian revolutionaries
Bulgarian military personnel of the Balkan Wars
Macedonian Bulgarians
Members of the National Assembly (Bulgaria)
Deaths by firearm in Bulgaria
20th-century Bulgarian politicians
People from Serres (regional unit)
Emigrants from the Ottoman Empire to Bulgaria